Phedimus spurius, the Caucasian stonecrop or two-row stonecrop, is a species of flowering plant in the family Crassulaceae. It is still widely listed in the literature as Sedum spurium.

Description
Phedimus spurius is a spreading evergreen perennial with alternate, simple, fleshy leaves on creeping stems. The flowers are pink, borne in spring through fall.

Taxonomy
Phedimus spurius is one of a number of species of sedum that segregate amongst the Crassulaceae in the Rhodiola clade, and were placed in the tribe Umbiliceae. These species are generally regarded as forming a separate genus, Phedimus.}

Cultivation
Several cultivars exist, of which Phedimus spurius 'Schorbuser Blut', with rich pink flowers, has received the Royal Horticultural Society's Award of Garden Merit.

References

Bibliography 

  (full text at ResearchGate)
 
 , in Flora of China online vol. 8
 

spurium